David Bryan Grusky (born April 14, 1958) is an American sociologist and the Barbara Kimball Browning Professor in the School of Humanities and Sciences at Stanford University. He is also a senior fellow of the Stanford Institute for Economic Policy Research and the director of the Stanford Center on Poverty and Inequality. He formerly taught at Cornell University, where he was the founder and founding director of the Center for the Study of Inequality.

Career
Grusky attended Reed College, graduating with a bachelor's degree in sociology in 1980. He then went on to the University of Wisconsin-Madison, earning a master's degree in 1983 and PhD in 1987, both in sociology. His master's thesis was Industrialization and the Status Attainment Process: Meritocracy Denied and his dissertation was American Social Mobility and Fertility in the United States, both advised by Robert Hauser. He joined the University of Chicago in 1986 as an assistant professor of sociology, before moving to Stanford University, where he remained until 1999. From 1999 to 2004, he was a professor of sociology at Cornell University, and then returned to Stanford.

Honors and awards
Grusky is a fellow of the American Association for the Advancement of Science and a former Presidential Young Investigator. He was the joint winner of the 2005 Max Weber Award from the American Sociological Association.

References

External links
Faculty page

Living people
Stanford University School of Humanities and Sciences faculty
Cornell University faculty
Reed College alumni
 University of Wisconsin–Madison College of Letters and Science alumni
Fellows of the American Association for the Advancement of Science
1958 births
American sociologists